The year 1897 in science and technology involved some significant events, listed below.

Chemistry
 April 30 – J. J. Thomson first describes his discovery of the electron, in England.

Earth sciences
 June 12 – 1897 Assam earthquake of magnitude of 8.0 rocks Assam, India, killing over 1,500 people.

History of science and technology
 Adolf Erik Nordenskiöld publishes Periplus: An Essay on the Early History of Charts and Sailing Directions in Stockholm.
 Boulton and Watt's Smethwick Engine of 1779 (superseded 1892) is dismantled for preservation by the Birmingham Canal Navigations company, initially at its Ocker Hill depot in the West Midlands of England.

Mathematics
 David Hilbert unifies the field of algebraic number theory with his treatise Zahlbericht.
 John Edward Campbell originates the Baker–Campbell–Hausdorff formula for multiplication of exponentials in Lie algebras.
 Raoul Bricard investigates and classifies flexible polyhedra, defining the Bricard octahedron.
 Henri Brocard begins publication of his source book on geometric curves, Notes de Bibliographie des Courbes Géométriques, in Bar-le-Duc.

Physiology, medicine and pharmacology
 May 6 – John Jacob Abel announces the successful isolation of epinephrine (adrenaline) in a paper read before the Association of American Physicians.
 August 10 – History of aspirin: At the German Bayer chemical and dyestuffs company, pharmacist Felix Hoffmann successfully synthesizes acetylsalicylic acid, a synthetically altered version of salicin, as a less-irritating replacement for standard common salicylate medicines, after isolating a compound from a plant of the Spiraea family; the company markets it under the brand name 'Aspirin'.
 August 20 – Ronald Ross discovers the malaria Plasmodium in an Anopheles mosquito, demonstrating the transmission mechanism for the disease.
 Danish veterinarian Bernhard Bang isolates Brucella abortus as the agent of Brucellosis.
 L. Emmett Holt publishes the standard textbook The Diseases of Infancy and Childhood in New York.
 Charles Sherrington introduces the term 'synapse'.

Psychology
 Émile Durkheim publishes his classic study Le Suicide.

Technology
 January 22 – The word computer is first used to refer to a mechanical calculation device, in this date's issue of the journal Engineering.
 May 11 – A patent is awarded for the invention of the first automotive muffler, with the granting by the U.S. Patent Office of application number 582,485 to Milton Reeves and his brother Marshall T. Reeves, of the Reeves Pulley Company of Columbus, Indiana.
 May 17 – Launch of the Holland VI (later ), designed by John Philip Holland, at Lewis Nixon's Crescent Shipyard in Elizabeth, New Jersey; this is the first submarine having power to run submerged for any considerable distance, and the first to combine electric motors for submerged travel and gasoline (Otto) engines for use on the surface.
 June 26 – At the British Fleet Review, Charles Parsons gives a spectacular display of the unprecedented speed attainable by his steam turbine-powered Turbinia.
 August 10 – Rudolf Diesel demonstrates his first commercially successful Diesel engine in Augsburg.
 August 31 – Thomas Edison is granted a patent for the Kinetoscope, a precursor of the movie projector.
 Hiram P. Maxim develops the muffler in conjunction with the firearm silencer (suppressor).
 The Dahlander pole changing motor is patented.
 The Daimler Victoria, the world's first meter-equipped (and gasoline-powered) taxicab, is built by Gottlieb Daimler.

Awards
 Copley Medal: Albert von Kölliker
 Wollaston Medal: Wilfred Hudleston

Births
 January 1 – Ana Aslan (died 1988), Romanian biologist.
 March 24 – Wilhelm Reich (died 1957), Austrian psychoanalyst.
 July 20 – Tadeusz Reichstein (died 1996), Polish-born Nobel Prize-winning chemist.
 August 5 – Joan Beauchamp Procter (died 1931), English herpetologist.
 August 12 – Otto Struve (died 1963), Ukrainian-born astronomer.
 September 1 – Mary Cover Jones (died 1987), American behavioral therapist.
 September 12 – Irène Joliot-Curie (died 1956), French chemist.
 November 4 – C. B. van Niel (died 1985), Dutch-born microbiologist.
 November 13 – Tilly Edinger (died 1967), German-born paleoneurologist.
 December 22 – Vojtěch Jarník (died 1970), Czech mathematician.

Deaths
 January 25 – David Kirkaldy (born 1820), Scottish-born engineer, pioneer of materials testing.
 February 7 – Galileo Ferraris, Italian physicist and engineer (born 1847)
 February 19 – Karl Weierstrass (born 1815), German mathematician.
 March 3 – John Peirce (born 1836), American inventor.
 March 15 – James Joseph Sylvester (born 1814), English mathematician.
 April 12 – Edward Drinker Cope (born 1840), American paleontologist.
 May 6
 Edward James Stone (born 1831), English astronomer.
 Alfred Des Cloizeaux (born 1817), French mineralogist.
 May 7 – Abraham Dee Bartlett (born 1812), English zoologist.
 August 27 – Eduard von Hofmann (born 1837), Austrian forensic pathologist.
 October 19 – George Pullman (born 1831), American inventor.
 October 31 – Samuel Haughton (born 1821), Irish scientific polymath.
 November 1 – Peter Bellinger Brodie (born 1815), English geologist and clergyman.
 November 14 – Thomas W. Evans (born 1823), American-born dentist.

References

 
19th century in science
1890s in science